"A Letter on Justice and Open Debate", also known as the Harper's Letter, is an open letter defending free speech published on the Harper's Magazine website on July 7, 2020, with 153 signatories, criticizing what it called "illiberalism"  spreading across society. While the letter denounced President Donald Trump as "a real threat to democracy", it argued that hostility to free speech was becoming widespread on the political left as well.

Background

The letter was drafted by writers Robert Worth, George Packer, David Greenberg, Mark Lilla and Thomas Chatterton Williams. Williams, described by The New York Times as having "spearheaded" the effort, was initially worried that its timing might cause it to be viewed as a reaction to the George Floyd protests, which he viewed as a legitimate response to police brutality in the United States, but ultimately decided to publish it, citing various recent events such as the firing of David Shor. Shor was fired after public backlash from tweeting a paper by Omar Wasow, which argued nonviolent protest was more effective at shaping public opinion.

In total, around 20 people contributed to the contents of the letter.

Summary
The letter describes right-wing illiberalism and then-US president Donald Trump as "a real threat to democracy", but argues that the political left engages in censorship of its own, denouncing "an intolerance of opposing views, a vogue for public shaming and ostracism, and the tendency to dissolve complex policy issues in a blinding moral certainty." Per the letter, "Editors are fired for running controversial pieces; books are withdrawn for alleged inauthenticity; journalists are barred from writing on certain topics; professors are investigated for quoting works of literature in class; a researcher is fired for circulating a peer-reviewed academic study; and the heads of organizations are ousted for what are sometimes just clumsy mistakes", "The restriction of debate, whether by a repressive government or an intolerant society, invariably hurts those who lack power and makes everyone less capable of democratic participation", and "We need to preserve the possibility of good-faith disagreement without dire professional consequences." The letter concludes, "If we won’t defend the very thing on which our work depends, we shouldn’t expect the public or the state to defend it for us."

Signatories 
The letter is signed by 153 people, mostly scholars and writers. They include academics from Harvard University, Yale University, Princeton University, and Columbia University.

Notable signatories include linguist Noam Chomsky; fiction writers J. K. Rowling, Salman Rushdie, Margaret Atwood, Martin Amis, John Banville, Daniel Kehlmann, and Jeffrey Eugenides; world chess champion Garry Kasparov; political scientist Francis Fukuyama; feminist Gloria Steinem; cognitive psychologist Steven Pinker; journalists Fareed Zakaria, Malcolm Gladwell, Anne Applebaum, Ian Buruma, David Frum, and David Brooks; composer Wynton Marsalis; writer and former Leader of the Liberal Party of Canada Michael Ignatieff; political theorist Michael Walzer; economist Deirdre McCloskey; poet Roya Hakakian; surgeon Atul Gawande; music journalist Greil Marcus; and social psychologist Jonathan Haidt.
Signatories generally did not know who had signed the letter until it was published. At least one, Jennifer Finney Boylan, expressed qualms about some of the other signatories but affirmed her endorsement. Others who reaffirmed their support for the letter's contents, such as Katha Pollitt, said they disagreed with some of the signatories on other issues but did not mind signing the same statement.

Full list

 Elliot Ackerman
 Saladin Ambar
 Martin Amis
 Anne Applebaum
 Marie Arana
 Margaret Atwood
 John Banville
 Mia Bay
 Louis Begley
 Roger Berkowitz
 Paul Berman
 Sheri Berman
 Reginald Dwayne Betts
 Neil Blair
 David W. Blight
 Jennifer Finney Boylan
 David Bromwich
 David Brooks
 Ian Buruma
 Lea Carpenter
 Noam Chomsky
 Nicholas Christakis
 Roger Cohen
 Frances D. Cook
 Drucilla Cornell
 Kamel Daoud
 Meghan Daum
 Gerald Early
 Jeffrey Eugenides
 Dexter Filkins
 Federico Finchelstein
 Caitlin Flanagan
 Richard T. Ford
 Kmele Foster
 David Frum
 Francis Fukuyama
 Atul Gawande
 Todd Gitlin
 Kim Ghattas
 Malcolm Gladwell
 Michelle Goldberg
 Rebecca Goldstein
 Anthony Grafton
 David Greenberg
 Linda Greenhouse
  (withdrawn)
 Rinne B. Groff
 Sarah Haider
 Jonathan Haidt
 Roya Hakakian
 Shadi Hamid
 Jeet Heer
 Katie Herzog
 Susannah Heschel
 Adam Hochschild
 Arlie Russell Hochschild
 Eva Hoffman
 Coleman Hughes
 Hussein Ibish
 Michael Ignatieff
 Zaid Jilani
 Bill T. Jones
 Wendy Kaminer
 Matthew Karp
 Garry Kasparov
 Daniel Kehlmann
 Randall Kennedy
 Khaled Khalifa
 Parag Khanna
 Laura Kipnis
 Frances Kissling
 Enrique Krauze
 Anthony Kronman
 Joy Ladin
 Nicholas Lemann
 Mark Lilla
 Susie Linfield
 Damon Linker
 Dahlia Lithwick
 Steven Lukes
 John R. MacArthur
 Susan Madrak
 Phoebe Maltz Bovy
 Greil Marcus
 Wynton Marsalis
 Kati Marton
 Debra Mashek
 Deirdre McCloskey
 John McWhorter
 Uday Mehta
 Andrew Moravcsik
 Yascha Mounk
 Samuel Moyn
 Meera Nanda
 Cary Nelson
 Olivia Nuzzi
 Mark Oppenheimer
 Dael Orlandersmith
 George Packer
 Nell Irvin Painter
 Greg Pardlo
 Orlando Patterson
 Steven Pinker
 Letty Cottin Pogrebin
 Katha Pollitt
 Claire Bond Potter
 Taufiq Rahim
 Zia Haider Rahman
 Jennifer Ratner-Rosenhagen
 Jonathan Rauch
 Neil Roberts
 Melvin Rogers
 Kat Rosenfield
 Loretta J. Ross
 J. K. Rowling
 Salman Rushdie
 Karim Sadjadpour
 Daryl Michael Scott
 Diana Senechal
 Jennifer Senior
 Judith Shulevitz
 Jesse Singal
 Anne-Marie Slaughter
 Andrew Solomon
 Deborah Solomon
 Allison Stanger
 Paul Starr
 Wendell Steavenson
 Gloria Steinem
 Nadine Strossen
 Ronald S. Sullivan Jr.
 Kian Tajbakhsh
 Zephyr Teachout
 Cynthia Tucker
 Adaner Usmani
 Chloé Valdary
 Lucía Martínez Valdivia
 Helen Vendler
 Judy B. Walzer
 Michael Walzer
 Eric K. Washington
 Caroline Weber
 Randi Weingarten
 Bari Weiss
 Cornel West
 Sean Wilentz
 Garry Wills
 Thomas Chatterton Williams
 Robert F. Worth
 Molly Worthen
 Matthew Yglesias
 Emily Yoffe
 Cathy Young
 Fareed Zakaria

Reaction 
The letter drew mixed reactions on social media. In an opinion piece for CNN, John Avlon praised the letter, writing, "Demonizing principled disagreement does not advance liberal values—it fuels negative partisan narratives that Trump's reelection depends on. It can distract from actual purveyors of hate, and a sitting President who advances policies that are often racist or homophobic as well as anti-immigrant." In another CNN opinion piece, Jeff Yang criticized the letter, writing, "it's hard not to see the letter as merely an elegantly written affirmation of elitism and privilege", and that the signatories "in the face of resultant backlash, dismissed rebuttals and positioned themselves as beleaguered victims of the current culture, turning their support for open debate and free expression into an example of stark hypocrisy or sly gaslighting."  Historian Nicole Hemmer criticized the letter's timing, stating that the letter primarily blamed cancel culture for disrupting free and open conversations at a moment during the George Floyd protests when it was becoming clearer what influence institutions had in controlling debate.

Vox writer and signatory Matthew Yglesias faced pushback from transgender coworker Emily St. James, who criticized the letter for being signed by "several prominent anti-trans voices". This included Rowling, who attracted controversy for her comments on transgender issues. 

A response letter, "A More Specific Letter on Justice and Open Debate", organized by the lecturer Arionne Nettles and signed by over 160 people in academia and media, critiqued the Harper's letter as a plea to end cancel culture by successful professionals with large platforms while excluding others who have been "cancelled for generations". The response named specific incidents in which Black people were silenced by their institutions. Multiple signatories omitted either their names or institutional affiliations, citing fear of "professional retaliation".

Kerri Greenidge later asked for her name to be removed from the Harper's letter, which was done.

References

External links 
 A Letter on Justice and Open Debate, Harper's Magazine

2020 controversies in the United States
2020 documents
2020 essays
Criticism of Donald Trump
Open letters
Works originally published in Harper's Magazine